Ryan Lynch (born July 31, 1986) is an American former professional stock car racing driver. He has raced in the NASCAR Camping World Truck Series.

Racing career
Lynch began in kart racing at the age of eight before moving to late models. In 2010, he finished fifth in the United States Super Truck Series standings.

In 2011, he tested with the ARCA Racing Series at Daytona International Speedway and made his NASCAR K&N Pro Series East debut at South Boston Speedway. He also ran the ARCA race at Salem Speedway, where he finished 13th. A year later, he began racing in the NASCAR Camping World Truck Series with the support of former NASCAR driver Rick Crawford. Between 2012 and 2016, he ran six Truck races with a best run of 22nd at Texas Motor Speedway in 2014.

Personal life
Lynch graduated from Texarkana College and the University of Texas at Tyler.

Motorsports career results

NASCAR
(key) (Bold – Pole position awarded by qualifying time. Italics – Pole position earned by points standings or practice time. * – Most laps led.)

Camping World Truck Series

K&N Pro Series East

ARCA Racing Series
(key) (Bold – Pole position awarded by qualifying time. Italics – Pole position earned by points standings or practice time. * – Most laps led.)

References

External links
 
 

1986 births
NASCAR drivers
Living people
Racing drivers from Texas
University of Texas at Tyler alumni
Texarkana College alumni
ARCA Menards Series drivers